Velarization or velarisation is a secondary articulation of consonants by which the back of the tongue is raised toward the velum during the articulation of the consonant.
In the International Phonetic Alphabet, velarization is transcribed by one of four diacritics:
To distinguish velarization from a velar fricative release,  may be used instead of <ref>Vd. Tryon (1995) Comparative Austronesian Dictionary"</ref>
Although electropalatographic studies have shown that there is a continuum of possible degrees of velarization, the IPA does not specify any way to indicate degrees of velarization, as the difference has not been found to be contrastive in any language. However, the IPA convention of doubling diacritics to indicate a greater degree can be used: .

Examples

English

A common example of a velarized consonant  is the velarized alveolar lateral approximant (or "dark L"). In some accents of English, such as Received Pronunciation and arguably General American English, the phoneme  has "dark" and "light" allophones: the "dark", velarized allophone  appears in syllable coda position (e.g. in full), while the "light", non-velarized allophone  appears in syllable onset position (e.g. in lawn). Other accents of English, such as Scottish English, Australian English, and potentially standard U.S. and Canadian accents, have "dark L" in all positions.

Velarized /l/
 Albanian phonemically contrasts light l and dark ll Catalan dialect and allophonic variance
 Portuguese dialect and allophonic variance 
 Turkish
 Kurdish
For many languages, velarization is generally associated with more dental articulations of coronal consonants so that dark l tends to be dental or dentoalveolar, and clear l tends to be retracted to an alveolar position.

Other velarized consonants
Danish realizes  in some environments as a velarized .
Irish and Marshallese have velarized consonants that systematically contrast with palatalized consonants.
Similarly, Russian has velarized consonants as allophones of the non-palatalized (plain) series, especially prominent before front vowels and with labial and velar consonants as well as the lateral.
Kurdish has three velarized consonants (and ) which contrast with plain ones.
Gilbertese has three velarized consonants (/mˠ/, /pˠ/, and /βˠ/), two of which (/mˠ/ and /pˠ/) contrast with a plain form.

The palatalized/velarized contrast is known by other names, especially in language pedagogy: in Irish and Scottish Gaelic language teaching, the terms slender (for palatalized) and broad (for velarized) are often used. In Scottish Gaelic the terms are caol (for palatalized) and leathann (for velarized).

The terms light or clear (for non-velarized or palatalized) and dark (for velarized) are also widespread. The terms "soft l " and "hard l " are not equivalent to "light l " and "dark l'' ". The former pair refers to palatalized ("soft" or iotated) and plain ("hard") Slavic consonants.

References

Sources 

 
 

Phonetics
Phonology
Australian English
Scottish English
Velar consonants
Secondary articulation